Biddick Lane railway station served the Fatfield area of Washington, in Tyne and Wear (historically County Durham), England. It was on the former Stanhope and Tyne Railway between Washington and Chester-le-Street. The station opened in 1864 and closed shortly after in 1869. The line remained in use for passenger and goods traffic until 1955 when the line was closed to passengers and the 1980s to freight traffic. The station has since been demolished and the line is now in use as the Consett and Sunderland Railway Path between Chester-le-Street and Washington.

References 

Disused railway stations in Tyne and Wear
Former North Eastern Railway (UK) stations
Railway stations in Great Britain opened in 1864
Railway stations in Great Britain closed in 1869
1850 establishments in England